Lagarde Park is a public park in Djibouti City, the capital of Djibouti. It is situated near the city's center. The park sits at an altitude of about 11 m (36 ft), making it one of the settlement's highest points.

Parks in Djibouti